Khánh Bình may refer to several places in Vietnam, including:

Khánh Bình, Bình Dương, a ward of Tân Uyên, Bình Dương
Khánh Bình, An Giang, a commune of An Phú District
Khánh Bình, Khánh Hòa, a commune of Khánh Vĩnh District
Khánh Bình, Cà Mau, a commune of Trần Văn Thời District

See also
The communes of Khánh Bình Đông, Khánh Bình Tây and Khánh Bình Tây Bắc in Trần Văn Thời District